Vanark, known in Japan as , is a combat flight simulation game developed by Bit Town and published by Asmik Ace and Jaleco in 1999–2000.

Reception

The game received mixed reviews according to the review aggregation website GameRankings. In Japan, Famitsu gave it a score of 24 out of 40. GamePro said of the game, "though not exceptional, Vanarks clever combination of disparate elements is worth experiencing—mainly as a rental."

Notes

References

External links
 

1999 video games
Asmik Ace Entertainment games
Combat flight simulators
Jaleco games
PlayStation (console) games
PlayStation (console)-only games
Video games developed in Japan